= Kujo =

Footwear company

- Industry: Manufacturing & Retail
- Founded: 2016; 10 years ago
- Products: Shoes

Kujo is an American outdoor footwear company specializing in shoes made for yard work. The company is based out of Cleveland, Ohio.

== History ==
Kujo successfully launched on Kickstarter in June 2017, and began selling in February 2018.

The name "Kujo" is in honor of the founder's late cousin.
